Robert Alan "Bob" Edwards  is an American broadcast journalist, a Peabody Award-winning member of the National Radio Hall of Fame.  He hosted both of National Public Radio's flagship news programs, the afternoon All Things Considered, and Morning Edition, where he was the first and longest serving host in the latter program's history.  Starting in 2004, Edwards then was the host of The Bob Edwards Show on Sirius XM Radio and Bob Edwards Weekend distributed by Public Radio International to more than 150 public radio stations. Those programs ended in September 2015. Edwards currently hosts a podcast for AARP.

Personal life and early career
Edwards is a graduate of St. Xavier High School (Louisville) and the University of Louisville and began his radio career in 1968 at a small radio station in New Albany, Indiana, a town located across the Ohio River from Louisville. Afterwards, Edwards served in the U.S. Army, producing and anchoring TV and radio news programs for the American Forces Korea Network from Seoul. Following his army service, he went on to anchor news for WTOP / 1500, a CBS affiliate, in Washington, D.C. He also earned an M.A. in communication from American University in Washington, D.C. In 1972, at age 25, Edwards anchored national newscasts for the Mutual Broadcasting System. Edwards joined NPR in 1974. Before hosting Morning Edition, Edwards was co-host of All Things Considered. Edwards is married to NPR news anchor Windsor Johnston. He has two daughters, Eleanor and Susannah.

Host of Morning Edition
Edwards hosted NPR's flagship program, Morning Edition, from the show's inception in 1979 until 2004. After 24 plus years with Edwards as host, Arbitron ratings showed that, with 13 million listeners, it was the second highest-rated radio broadcast in the country, behind only Rush Limbaugh's AM show. Prior to his departure, he was very popular among both listeners and critics.

When Morning Edition and its host won a George Foster Peabody Award in 1999, the Peabody committee lauded Edwards as

Edwards' skills as an interviewer have been widely praised. NPR's ombudsman Jeffrey Dvorkin said, "If I were his producer, I would think of Edwards as NPR's version of Charlie Rose." The New York Daily News called him "an institution among Morning Edition listeners for his interviewing skills and his calm, articulate style." It is estimated that Edwards conducted over 20,000 interviews for NPR. His subjects ranged from major politicians to authors and celebrities. His weekly call-in chats with retired sportscaster Red Barber are fondly remembered. The chats were supposedly about sports, but often digressed into topics like the Gulf War, what kind of flowers were blooming at Barber's Tallahassee, Florida home, or other non-sport subjects. Barber would call Edwards "Colonel Bob," referring to Edwards' Kentucky Colonel honor from his native state. Barber died in 1992; the following year Edwards based his first book, Fridays with Red: A Radio Friendship, on the weekly interviews.

In 2003, Edwards was inducted into the Kentucky Journalism Hall of Fame.

Departure from NPR
 
In April 2004, NPR executives decided to "freshen up" Morning Edition'''s sound. Edwards was removed as host, replaced with Steve Inskeep and Renée Montagne, and reassigned as a senior correspondent for NPR News. The move took him by surprise. "I'd rather stay," he said, "but it's not my decision to make."

At first, NPR executives and spokespersons did not fully explain the move, leaving many listeners confused. Eventually they did make some attempts to explain themselves. According to NPR spokeswoman Laura Gross, "It's part of a natural evolution. A new host will bring new ideas and perspectives to the show. Bob's voice will still be heard; he'll still be a tremendous influence on the show. We just felt it was time for a change."

Executive Vice President Ken Stern also explained the move. "This change in Morning Edition is part of the ongoing evaluation of all NPR programming that has taken place over the last several years. We've looked at shows like All Things Considered and Talk of the Nation with an eye to how we can best serve listeners in the future." Although Stern later participated in an online chat with listeners at NPR's website, it only heightened their confusion and anger.

The decision to remove Edwards, made shortly before his 25th anniversary with the show, was met with much criticism by listeners. Jeffrey Dvorkin, NPR's ombudsman, reported that the network received over 50,000 letters and emails, most of them angry, regarding Edwards' demotion; the listener reaction was the largest reaction on a single subject that NPR had received to that date. Other journalists, including ABC's Cokie Roberts and CBS' Charles Osgood, expressed dissatisfaction with the move.

His final broadcast as host was on April 30, 2004; his last Morning Edition interview was with Charles Osgood, who had also been Edwards' first Morning Edition interview subject almost 25 years earlier. Coincidentally, the last show also included a segment about the last Oldsmobile, which rolled off an assembly line the day before.

During his final months at NPR, Edwards wrote his second book, Edward R. Murrow and the Birth of Broadcast Journalism. The book, a short biography of Edward R. Murrow, brought some public attention to history's most noted broadcast journalist prior to the release of the 2004 film Good Night and Good Luck. NPR removed Edwards from Morning Edition that spring rather than waiting for his 25th anniversary with the show in the fall, using the book tour to make a "clean break" rather than bringing him back for a final three-month stint.

Edwards decided not to remain at NPR as a senior correspondent and filed only one story, an interview with Bob Dole and other Senate veterans of World War II about the Washington, DC, World War II memorial, in that role. Three months after his departure from Morning Edition, XM Satellite Radio announced that he had signed on to host a new program, The Bob Edwards Show, for its new XM Public Radio channel.

His memoir, A Voice in the Box, was published in September 2011.

Sirius XM Satellite Radio career
"They want to give me a program, so I can continue to host and be heard every day instead of occasionally, as I would have been at NPR," Edwards told The Washington Post. He said the format would be "loose": "It'll be long interviews, short interviews, and then maybe departments... You've got to have the news ... it's not going to be all features, yet it's not going to be the Financial Times, either." The Bob Edwards Show's first broadcast was on October 4, 2004. Washington Post columnist David Broder and former CBS News anchor Walter Cronkite were Edwards' first guests.

While continuing his daily show on XM, Edwards returned to public radio stations in January 2006 with his show Bob Edwards Weekend, produced by XM Satellite Radio and distributed by Public Radio International to affiliate stations around the country. A September 22, 2005 press release from PRI states, "Bob Edwards Weekend will provide PRI listeners with an opportunity to sample some of the astute commentary and intriguing interviews offered to XM subscribers each weekday on The Bob Edwards Show." This was the first time that a satellite radio company provided programming to over-the-air terrestrial radio.The Bob Edwards Show has received several awards, including: the Deems Taylor Award from ASCAP (2006); a Gabriel Award from the Catholic Academy for Communication Arts Professionals (2006), The National Press Club's Robert L. Kozic Award for Environmental Reporting (2007) for the documentary, "Exploding Heritage", about mountaintop-removal coal mining. That program was also honored with a Gabriel Award, a 2006 New York Festivals Gold World Medal, and an award from the Society of Environmental Journalists.

In 2008, The Bob Edwards Show received an Edward R. Murrow Award from the Radio-Television News Directors Association and a New York Festivals / United Nations Gold Award for the documentary, "The Invisible: Children without homes". "The Invisible" also was honored by the Journalism Center for Children and Families and by the Catholic Academy for Communication Arts Professionals.

In 2009, the show received a Sigma Delta Chi Award from the Society of Professional Journalists for the documentary, "Stories from Third Med: Surviving a Jungle ER." The documentary also received a Gabriel Award. In September 2012, Edwards was named a Fellow of the Society of Professional Journalists. In 2013, the program was awarded a Robert F. Kennedy Journalism Award for the documentary, "An Occupational Hazard: Rape in the military". The show's last live episode aired on September 26, 2014.

AARP podcast
In July 2018, Edwards joined with AARP to host a podcast, Take On Today'', which is published most Thursdays. The program covers topics of health, work, money, aging, and entertainment, including interviews and panel discussions of issues relevant to older Americans.

Professional life
In November 2004, Edwards was inducted into the National Radio Hall of Fame. He continues to offer verbal support for public radio. In 2009, he donated his papers and his library to American University in Washington, DC.  He holds honorary degrees from the University of Louisville, Spalding University, Bellarmine University, Willamette University, Grinnell College, DePaul University, the University of St. Francis, and Albertson College.

See also
 List of people from the Louisville metropolitan area

Footnotes

References

External links
 The Bob Edwards Show
 The Bob Edwards Show schedule on XM Satellite Radio
 NPR Tribute to Bob Edwards
 MSNBC on Edwards' XM Show
 The Washington Post on Edwards' XM Show
 XM Press Release Announcing Edwards' XM Show
 An Interview with Edwards
 Audio Interview on The Sound of Young America: MP3 Link
 The Bob Edwards Show Discussion Forum
 

Departure from NPR
 NPR Press Release on Edwards' Leaving Morning Edition
 The Boston Globes initial story
 MSNBC's initial story
 ''USA Today'''s initial story
 The Washington Posts initial story
 The ''New York Daily News''' initial story
 NPR Omsbudsman Jeffrey Dvorkin's First Column on Edwards' Departure
 Dvorkin Looks Back a Year Later
 The Washington Post: Edwards Speaks out a Year After His Departure
 Public Radio International press release announcing Bob Edwards Weekend program
 Video interview with Bob Edwards 2 years after leaving NPR

1947 births
American radio journalists
American radio hosts
Living people
American broadcast news analysts
American talk radio hosts
NPR personalities
Public Radio International personalities
XM Satellite Radio
Edward R. Murrow Award (CPB) winners
Peabody Award winners
Radio personalities from Louisville, Kentucky
American University School of Communication alumni
University of Louisville alumni
United States Army soldiers
20th-century American journalists
American male journalists
21st-century American journalists